The High School Affiliated to Minzu University Of China, colloquially Mindafuzhong abbreviated to MDFZ, is the affiliated high school of Minzu University of China, and is one of the prestigious high schools in Beijing.

Achievement
Since its establishment in 1913, the school has been given awards by State Ethnic Affairs Commission and Beijing Municipality Education Commission.

Notable alumni

Academics

Law and Politics
 Ulanhu - Vice-President to the People's Republic of China (1983-1988).

Business and Media

Writers

Others

High schools in Beijing
Minzu University
Educational institutions established in 1913
1913 establishments in China